This is a list of musicians whose body of work is tagged as "lo-fi". Individuals are sorted by surname.

B

C

G

J

K

M

N

P

R

S

References

Lo-fi